Levels of corruption in Luxembourg are generally said to be very low, and there a strong legal framework for combating corruption  in the country. Surveys however indicate that a majority of the population believe political parties are either "corrupt" or "extremely corrupt."

Political corruption does surface. According to Transparency International Global Corruption Barometer 2013, 53% of the surveyed households considered political parties "corrupt" or "extremely corrupt", and 33% had the same opinion about Parliament. Moreover, a significant number of the surveyed households considered that the government's fight against corruption "ineffective" and that corruption had increased over the previous two years. However, on Transparency International's 2021 Corruption Perceptions Index, Luxembourg scored 81 on a scale from 0 ("highly corrupt") to 100 ("highly clean"). When ranked by score, Luxembourg ranked 9th among the 180 countries in the Index, where the country ranked first is perceived to have the most honest public sector.  For comparison, the best score was 88 (ranked 1), and the worst score was 11 (ranked 180).

Regarding business and corruption, companies do not consider corruption an obstacle for doing business in Luxembourg, according to World Economic Forum Global Competitiveness Report 2013-2014. However, several other sources indicate that the overlap between business and politics in Luxembourg gives opportunities for corruption, and there is no code of conduct focusing on corruption, conflict of interest and favouritism for procurement officials.

References

External links
Luxembourg Corruption Profile from the Business Anti-Corruption Portal

Luxembourg
Crime in Luxembourg by type
Politics of Luxembourg